Vicente Pires is an administrative region in the Federal District in Brazil. It is bordered by Taguatinga to the west, Águas Claras to the south, Guará to the southeast, Brasília to the north, and Brazlândia to the northwest. Vicente Pires is the 16th largest administrative region by population.

History 
Vicente Pires was created on May 26, 2009, by the approval of law nº 814/2008. Vicente Pires was dismembered from Taguatinga and started to have its own administration, becoming an administrative region. This occurred 20 years after the first farms in the former agricultural colony. Vicente Pires then comes to comprise the Vicente Pires Housing Sector, Samambaia Housing Sector, São José Housing Sector and Cana-do-Reino Housing Sector.

Some streets were restored, but the population still suffers with the lack of conservation and potholes. More recently, there have been investments to the administrative region's road infrastructure.

Geography 
The Administrative Region is bordered by Taguatinga, Águas Claras, Guará, SCIA, SAI, Brazlândia and the Brasília.

Infrastructure 
Vicente Pires is served by a power grid, public lighting and asphalt paving, with projects for a water supply and sanitation system in the implementation phase. The region presents recurring problems regarding the maintenance of roads, being sensitive to flooding and easily deteriorating in periods with heavy rainfall, which gave it the nickname "Buraco Pires".

See also
List of administrative regions of the Federal District

References

External links

 Regional Administration of Vicente Pires website
 Government of the Federal District website

Administrative regions of Federal District (Brazil)